Dietmar Trillus (born 21 May 1958) is a German-born athlete who represents Canada when competing in compound archery. He took up archery in 2000, and has since won several stages of the FITA Archery World Cup, including the 2008 Final, and the 2007 World Championships.

In 2010 Dietmar became the first non-USA resident to win the prestigious Vegas Indoor Archery Festival in Mens Championship.

References

1958 births
Living people
Canadian male archers
World Archery Championships medalists